The 1931 Providence Friars football team was an American football team that represented Providence College during the 1931 college football season. Led by seventh-year head coach Archie Golembeski, the team compiled a 7–3 record and outscored opponents by a total of 141 to 95.

Schedule

References

Providence
Providence Friars football seasons
Providence Friars football